This is a complete list of Forlanini airships designed and built by the Italian pioneer Enrico Forlanini from 1900 to 1931 (posthumously). These, like the German Groß-Basenach semi-rigid airships, were the first to have the gondola attached to the envelope, to reduce air resistance.

F.1 Leonardo da Vinci
Designed: 1900-1901
Maiden flight: 2 July 1909
Flights: 38, total distance 850 km.
Longest duration: 90 minutes
Length: 40 metres
Volume: 3,265 cubic metres
Propulsion: One Antoinette engine of 40 HP
Maximum speed: 52 km/h

Construction started in 1900 collaboration with Cesare del Fabbro. Its first flight in 1909 was one year after the first Italian semi-rigid flight by Gaetano Arturo Crocco. Like all the Forlanini airships, except the Omnia Dir, the empennage comprised groups of multiple planes at the poop and at the tail.

F.2 Città di Milano
Maiden flight: 17 August 1913
Flights: 43
Length: 72 metres
Volume: 12,000 cubic metres
Gas cells: 12
Propulsion: Two Isotta Fraschini engines of 80 HP each
Maximum speed: 70 km/h
Flight ceiling: 2400 metres
Useful payload: 5 tonne
Owner: Royal Italian Army (Regio Esercito)
Fate: 9 April 1914 emergency landing during storm, then damaged by trees and terrain while moored. While attempting to deflate gas cells, caught fire and destroyed.

F.2's gondola was divided in three compartments: the command cabin, passenger cabin, and machine room. For safety all the material was treated with a fire suppressant and the envelope was double-skinned.

F.3 Città di Milano II

Volume: 13,790 cubic metres
Propulsion: Four FIAT S.54-A engines of 80 HP each
Maximum speed: 80 km/h
Flight endurance: 24 hours
Useful payload: 6 tonne
Fate: built for the British government but due to World War I requisitioned by the Italian Army in 1918

F.4

Volume: 15,000 cubic metres
Built: 1915
Owner: Marina Italiana

F.5

Built: 1917
Volume: 17,783 cubic metres
Length: 
Maximum width: 
Propulsion: Two FIAT S.76-A engines of 350 HP each
Flight ceiling: 
Gas cells: 12
Payload: 
Crew: 5: commander, two officers, two mechanics
Owner: Royal Italian Army
Fate: military operations, decommissioned 6 February 1918

F.6
Built: 1918
Volume: 15,000 cubic metres
Propulsion: Four Isotta Fraschini IV-B engines of 180 HP each
Owner: Royal Italian Army (Regio Esercito)
Fate: one single military mission before the armistice

Omnia Dir
Built: 1931
Volume: 4,000 cubic metres
Propulsion: One Isotta Fraschini of 150 HP
Note: Used two groups of five jets of compressed air for maneuvering, one at each end

See also
Enrico Forlanini
Airships of Italy
Italian military aircraft 1910-1919

Notes

References
aerostati.it. Cronologia aerostatica (Italian) last accessed 2008-06-30
Lapini, Gian Luca. 2004. Storia di Milano ::: Enrico Forlanini (Italian) last accessed 2008-06-30
Sandro Ligugnana - Alessandro Ligugnana History - Officine Leonardo da Vinci. Last accessed 2009-09-09
The New York Times Magazine. 13 January 1918 Page SM3. New Italian Airship Better Than Zeppelin, last accessed 2008-06-30 (full article)
editors of Italian wikipedia article Forlanini (dirigibili) - Wikipedia

Airships of Italy
Lists of airships
1910s Italian military aircraft